Saraswati Devi, born Khorshed Minocher-Homji (1912 – 9 August 1980), was an Indian director of music and score composer who worked in Hindi cinema in the 1930s and 1940s. She  is most noted for her score, Mein Ban ki Chiriyra Banke Bun Bun Bolun Re in Bombay Talkies's Achut Kanya (1936). She along with Nargis' mother & Sanjay Dutt's grandmother Jaddanbai is considered to be one of the first female music composers in Indian cinema.

Early life and education
Born in a Parsi family, she had a love for music. Realising this her father made her study Hindustani classical music under Vishnu Narayan Bhatkhande who was specialised in Dhrupad and Dhamar style of singing. Later she joined Marris College (later Bhatkhande Music Institute) at Lucknow and studied music.

Career
With the setting up of an All India Radio station at Mumbai in the late 1920s she, along with her sister Manek, gave musical performances regularly. The programme, known as the Homji Sisters, was very popular with the listeners. The founder of Bombay Talkies, Himanshu Rai who was looking for a good classicalist for his movies, heard them on radio, got in touch with her, and invited her to visit the studio where she was shown the music room. He wanted her to take care of the music department and score music for his movies and Homji accepted the offer and took it as a challenge. Her first assignment was for the movie, Jawani Ki Hawa in 1935, starring Himanshu Rai's actress wife Devika Rani. She had a difficult time making the actors sing and had to simplify the tunes and cover some areas with music instead of song as they were no singers and play back was still not introduced.

"Jawani Ki Hawa" was followed by her first hit movie Achut Kanya (1936). Ashok Kumar, along with Devika Rani, where she spent several hours a day for day rehearsing for a song before it was filmed. Also in 1936, she gave the music for the film, Janmabhoomi, it was released during the Indian independence movement, and featured one of the first explicit nationalistic songs of Hindi cinema, "Jai Jai Janani Janmabhoomi" (Hail the land of our birth) written by J. S. Kashyap.  Subsequently, a tune from the chorus of this song was used by the BBC as a signature tune for its Indian News Service.

There was a big uproar and a series of protests in the Parsi community. The board of directors of Bombay Talkies included some members from the Parsi community who objected to girls from their community being in the talkies. Rai defended them and Homji's identity was concealed by giving her the name Saraswati Devi. Her sister, who acted roles for the company, was given the name Chandraprabha. Devi is the first female music director in Hindi films.

Devi continued composing film music until 1961. She composed the song Koi Humdum Na Raha originally sung by Ashok Kumar in the film Jeevan Naiya (1936) and later sung by Kishore Kumar in Jhumroo (1961). She is also the original composer of famous song Ek Chatur Naar Kar Ke Shringar originally sung by Ashok Kumar in film Jhoola (1941) later sung by Manna Dey and Kishore Kumar in film Padosan.

Death
She never married and lived alone in her apartment. One day she fell down from a bus and fractured her hip bone. None of the film personalities ever came for her help. The only help she got was from her neighbours. Saraswati Devi died on 9 August 1980 at the age of 68 leaving behind unforgettable memories of an era of which she was a golden link.

Filmography

References

Bibliography

External links
 
https://www.youtube.com/watch?v=RtthfgNa7YY Original Ek Chatur Naar Kar Kar Shringar

1912 births
1980 deaths
Indian music arrangers
Parsi people from Mumbai
Hindi film score composers
Women film score composers
20th-century Indian composers
Indian women composers
20th-century Indian women musicians
Musicians from Mumbai
Women musicians from Maharashtra
20th-century Indian women singers
20th-century Indian singers
20th-century women composers